Corrado da Matelica (died 1446) was a Roman Catholic prelate who served as Bishop of Bagnoregio (1445–1446).

Biography
Corrado da Matelica  was appointed a priest in the Order of Friars Minor. On 26 September 1445, he was appointed by Pope Eugene IV as Bishop of Bagnoregio. He served as Bishop of Bagnoregio until his death in 1446.

References

External links and additional sources
 (for Chronology of Bishops) 
 (for Chronology of Bishops) 

15th-century English Roman Catholic bishops
1446 deaths
Bishops appointed by Pope Eugene IV